The Naval Education and Training Command (NETC) is an enterprise level shore command of the United States Navy with more than 19,000 military and staff personnel at more than 1,640 subordinate activities, sites, districts, stations, and detachments throughout the world.

The commander of Naval Education and Training Command (NETC) is currently a 2-star admiral. NETC itself is located at Naval Air Station Pensacola, Florida.

Naval Service Training Command 

Naval Service Training Command, based in Naval Station Great Lakes, in Great Lakes, Illinois is the one-star command that is responsible for the training of all new accessions into the United States Navy. He or she oversees the operation of Recruit Training Command, Great Lakes, Illinois, the Navy's only enlisted recruit training location, and is responsible for the operation of Officer Training Command at Naval Station Newport, Rhode Island, and the operation of the Naval Reserve Officers Training Corps (NROTC). The only accession route not commanded by NSTC is that of the United States Naval Academy, which is overseen by the Superintendent of the United States Naval Academy, who reports directly to the CNO.

NETC Learning Centers 

After initial training, most personnel must continue on to an apprentice-level training before entering the fleet. For that, Navy NETC has "learning centers" that provide those initial and continuing training to the personnel across the service: 
 Center for Surface Combat Systems, which is located on Naval Support Facility Dahlgren, trains combat systems personnel on the use and operation of Navy combat systems such as the Aegis Combat System. 
 Center for Information Warfare Training leads, manages and delivers Navy and joint force training in Intelligence, information warfare, Cryptology and Information Technology. 
 Center for Security Forces, headquartered at Joint Expeditionary Base Little Creek–Fort Story, is responsible for the promulgation of the Navy's Anti-terrorism, Expeditionary warfare and Survival, Evasion, Resistance and Escape (SERE) training, as well as the initial training of the Navy's Master-at-arms rate  
 Center for Explosive Ordnance Disposal & Diving, headquartered at Naval Support Activity Panama City, in Panama City, Florida is responsible for the training and education of Navy EOD Technicians and Navy Divers 
 Center for SEAL (Sea, Air, and Land) and SWCC (Special Warfare Combatant-craft Crewman), or CENSEALSWCC, is aligned with the Naval Special Warfare (NSW)  enterprise to develop NSW’s flagship weapon system and capital resource – its People – to be the best Special Operations Forces leaders in the Department of Defense.
 Naval Submarine Learning Center, located at Naval Submarine Base New London, in Groton, Connecticut is responsible for the development of training for both enlisted and officer undersea (submarine) personnel. 
 Center for Service Support at Naval Station Newport is responsible for the training and education of the Navy's logistics, administration and media related officers and enlisted personnel
 Center for Naval Aviation Technical Training, is headquartered at Naval Air Station Pensacola, and it trains and educates all enlisted aviation rated personnel, as well as Aviation Maintenance Officers.
 Center for Seabees and Facilities Engineering, headquartered at Naval Base Ventura County, in Port Hueneme, CA, is responsible for the training and development of enlisted constructionmen (commonly known as Seabees) and the Civil Engineer Corps.
 Surface Warfare Schools Command, also located at Naval Station Newport provides education and training to surface warfare officers and enlisted engineers ratings.
 Engineering Officer Duty School, also located at NBVC provides training and professional development for Engineering duty officers.
 Naval Chaplaincy School and Center, located at Naval Station Newport, Rhode Island, is responsible for the training of both United States Navy Chaplain Corps officers and enlisted Religious Program Specialists.
 Naval Aviation Schools Command (NAVAVSCOLSCOM or NASC), located at Naval Air Station Pensacola, Florida, provides an educational foundation in technical training, character development, and professional leadership to prepare Navy, Marine Corps, Coast Guard and partner nation officers and enlisted students to be combat quality aviation professionals, and deliver them at the right time, in the right numbers, to be the forces their nation needs.
 The Naval Leadership and Ethics Center (NLEC) is headquartered at Naval Station Newport, Rhode Island, with locations in Dam Neck, Virginia and San Diego, California.  Each year, NLEC prepares the command triad (master chiefs/chiefs of the boat, executive officers, and commanding officers) for leadership success.
In addition, NETC operates Training Support Centers, that provide centralized student management and infrastructure support the individual learning centers and their subordinate sites, located in San Diego, Virginia Beach and Great Lakes, Illinois.

NETC Professional Development Center (NETPDC) 

Naval Education and Training Professional Development Center, which is located on Saufley Field in Escambia County, Florida is the home of all of the Navy's enlisted professional development programs and products, which include the administering Voluntary Education (VOLED) programs, including the Navy College program, which allows enlisted servicemembers to obtain college credits for Naval Training, as well as administering the Tuition Assistance program that pays for 100% of a servicemembers college courses expense while the member is active duty.

In addition, NETPDC administers, develops and delivers the Navy-wide Advancement examination, and processes individuals for advancement, in conjunction with the Bureau of Naval Personnel.

Commander of Naval Education and Training Command 

The Commander of Naval Education and Training is the individual responsible to the Chief of Naval Operations for the training and education of all enlisted and commissioned personnel of the United States Navy, and oversees the Naval Education and Training Command.

While not a member of the OPNAV staff, he is responsible to the Deputy Chief of Naval Operations (Manpower, Personnel, Training and Education) for the operation and management of the Navy Advancement Center, which uses bi-annual testing to advance enlisted members, and is "the principal advisor to the Chief of Naval Operations (CNO) and Commander, U.S. Fleet Forces Command (COMUSFLTFORCOM) on training and education related matters."

List of Commanders of Naval Education and Training and Commanders of Naval Education and Training Command

See also
U.S. Armed Forces training and education commands
 Army Training and Doctrine Command
 Marine Corps Training and Education Command
 Air Education and Training Command
 Space Training and Readiness Command

References

External links
 Naval Education and Training Command Website
 Commander of Naval Education and Training Command Bio

Shore commands of the United States Navy
Military units and formations established in the 1970s